Susan Bloch (1940 – 10 May 1982) was a theatrical press agent based in New York City.

Biography
Bloch was born in Canton, New York and attended Syracuse University.  She was the director of public relations for the Repertory Theater of Lincoln Center from 1965 to 1973.  She ran a graduate theater course at Fordham University and produced the Theater Highlights radio program on WNCN-FM. While working at Janus Films, she established a feature film library for public television stations.  She was awarded an Outer Critics Circle Award in 1971, the first such award for publicity and public relations.

Towards the end of her life, the Broadway theatre press agent Adrian Bryan-Brown worked with her.

She died from kidney disease in Tiburon, California in 1982. After her death, the Roundabout Theatre Company Stage 11 at 307 West 26th Street in Manhattan was named  Susan Bloch Theater in her honor.

References

1940 births
1982 deaths
American public relations people
American entertainment industry businesspeople
Businesspeople from New York City
Broadway press agents
People from Canton, New York
Syracuse University alumni
20th-century American businesspeople
20th-century American businesswomen
People from Tiburon, California